This bibliography of biology is a list of notable works, organized by subdiscipline, on the subject of biology.

Biology is a natural science concerned with the study of life and living organisms, including their structure, function, growth, origin, evolution, distribution, and taxonomy. Biology is a vast subject containing many subdivisions, topics, and disciplines. Subdisciplines of biology are recognized on the basis of the scale at which organisms are studied and the methods used to study them.

Anatomy

This section contains a list of works in anatomy, the study of the structure of living things.

 A landmark publication in anatomy and medicine.

First published under the title Gray's Anatomy: Descriptive and Surgical in Great Britain in 1858, and the following year in the United States. Gray died after the publication of the 1860 second edition, at the age of 34, but his book was continued by others. In 2008, for the 150th anniversary of the first edition, the 40th edition was released.

Biophysics

This section is a list of works on biophysics, an interdisciplinary science that uses the methods of physical science to study biological systems.

 English translation: 
Galvani's researches into stimulating muscles with electricity. His theory of an "animal electric fluid" was later disproved by Alessandro Volta, but stimulated research into bioelectricity.

Botany

This section is a list of works on botany, the scientific study of plant life.

:  Emphasizes plant family characteristics to facilitate plant identification. Used as a text at many universities and herbal schools.

Cell biology

This section contains a list of works on cell biology, the study of cells – their physiological properties, their structure, the organelles they contain, interactions with their environment, their life cycle, division and death.

Ecology

This section contains a list of works in ecology, the scientific study of the relations that living organisms have with respect to each other and their natural environment.

 Published in English as 
Turned descriptive faunistic/floristic biogeography into a new discipline, ecology. Based on his botanical investigations from Tropics to tundra, Warmings aimed to explain how similar environmental challenges (drought, flooding, cold, salt, herbivory etc.) were solved by plants in similar ways everywhere in the World, despite the different descent of species on different continents.

Gause formulated his Competitive exclusion principle, through experiments involving paramecia. The principle holds that no two species can co-exist for long if they have to compete for highly similar resources. This outcome has two preconditions: 1) panmixis of individuals of competing species, 2) the environment is homogeneous in time and space. These conditions may be met by aquatic microorganisms grown under laboratory conditions. However, in most real-world biotic communities, both conditions are likely to be violated from moderately to strongly. Due to its simplicity and intuitiveness, Gause's Competitive exclusion principle has had a great impact on subsequent ecological thinking.

Evolutionary biology

This section contains a list of works on evolution, the change across successive generations in the heritable characteristics of biological populations.

Until the publication of this encyclopedia much of the European scientific community thought that all animals were created by God about 6,000 years ago. Not only did this 44-volume encyclopedia contain all descriptive biological knowledge of its time, it offered a new theory. One hundred years before Darwin, Buffon claimed that man and ape might have a common ancestor. His work also had a significant impact on ecology.

 English translation: 

In September 1838 Charles Darwin conceived his theory of natural selection as the cause of evolution, then as well as developing his career as a naturalist worked privately on finding evidence and answering possible objections, circulating essays written in 1842 and 1844 to his friends. Wallace, who was corresponding with Darwin from Borneo, arrived independently at the same theory. He wrote his paper On The Tendency of Varieties to Depart Indefinitely from the Original Type in February 1858 and sent it to Darwin, who received it on 18 June 1858 and passed it to Lyell and Hooker. They arranged for a joint publication of Wallace's paper and an extract from Darwin's 1844 essay; this was read to the Linnean Society of London on 1 July 1858, and printed in the Zoological Journal of the Linnean Society 3: 46-50. It had little impact at the time, but spurred Darwin to write an "abstract" of the "big book" Natural Selection he was then working on; this condensed version was published in November 1859 as On the Origin of Species.
(Online: 6th Edition (text))
The Origin of Species is one of the hallmark works of biology. In this shortened abstract of his intended "big book" on Natural Selection, Darwin details his theory that organisms gradually evolve through a process of natural selection, and this process leads to the formation of new species. It was first published on November 24, 1859 and the initial print run was oversubscribed by booksellers at Murray's Autumn sale the day before.
Darwin presents a theory of natural selection that is in most aspects identical to the theories now accepted by scientists. He carefully argues out this theory by presenting accumulated scientific evidence from his voyage on the Beagle in the 1830s, and from his continuing studies up to the date of publication. His studies continued with the book being revised accordingly; the most extensive revisions were the 6th and final edition.
Darwin's theory of evolution by natural selection, with its tree-like model of branching common descent, has become the unifying theory of the life sciences. The theory explains the diversity of living organisms and their adaptation to the environment. It makes sense of the geologic record, biogeography, parallels in embryonic development, biological homologies, vestigiality, cladistics, phylogenetics and other fields, with unrivalled explanatory power; it has also become essential to applied sciences such as medicine and agriculture.

In the preface, Fisher considers some general points, including that there must be an understanding of natural selection distinct from that of evolution, and that the then-recent advances in the field of genetics (see history of genetics) now allowed this.  In the first chapter, Fisher considers the nature of inheritance, rejecting blending inheritance in favour of particulate inheritance.  The second chapter introduces Fisher's fundamental theorem of natural selection.  The third considers the evolution of dominance, which Fisher believed was strongly influenced by modifiers.  The last five chapters (8-12) include Fisher's more idiosyncratic views on eugenics. One of the founding works of population genetics.

Wilson introduced the term sociobiology as an attempt to explain the evolutionary mechanics behind social behaviors such as altruism, aggression, and nurturance. Wilson's book sparked one of the great scientific controversies in biology of the 20th century.

Critically revisits Haeckel's idea that ontogeny recapitulates phylogeny. Gould presents heterochrony as a concept that allows us to describe the majority of developmental processes in evolution. This book played a significant role at the time by bringing the evolutionary biology community back to examine developmental biology, ignored for many years.

A synthesis of many of the ideas of Evolutionary Psychology. This field posits that there are insights into the way that the mind works if you view our cognitive capabilities as the adaptive result of evolution. Synthesizes the work of many Evolutionary Psychologists and provides a comprehensive starting point for inquiries into (exactly as the title states) how the mind works.

Genetics

This section contains a list of works on genetics, the science of genes, heredity, and variation in living organisms.

The result of years spent studying genetic traits in pea plants. Mendel compared seven discrete traits. Through experimentation, Mendel discovered that one inheritable trait would invariably be dominant to its recessive alternative. This model, later known as Mendelian inheritance or Mendelian genetics, provided an alternative to blending inheritance, which was the prevailing theory at the time.

Based on a series of public lectures delivered at Trinity College, Dublin.  Schrödinger's lecture focused on one important question: "how can the events in space and time which take place within the spatial boundary of a living organism be accounted for by physics and chemistry?" He introduced the idea of an "aperiodic crystal" that contained genetic information in its configuration of covalent chemical bonds. In the 1950s,  Schrödinger's idea of an aperiodic crystal stimulated enthusiasm for discovering the genetic molecule. Francis Crick, co-discoverer of the structure of DNA, credited Schrödinger's book with presenting an early theoretical description of how the storage of genetic information would work, and acknowledged the book as a source of inspiration for his initial research.

 (Online version (Original text))

Microbiology
This section contains a list of publications on microbiology. Microbiology is the study of microorganisms, which are defined as any microscopic organism that comprises either a single cell (unicellular), cell clusters or no cell at all (acellular).

Molecular biology

This section contains a list of works on molecular biology, the study of the molecular basis of biological activity.

 (Online version (Original text))
Described a molecular structure for DNA that was consistent with X-ray diffraction data and had implications for the nature of ineritance.

Physiology
This section contains a list of works on physiology, the science of the function of living systems. This includes how organisms, organ systems, organs, cells and bio-molecules carry out the chemical or physical functions that exist in a living system.

 English translation:

Taxonomy

This section contains a list of works on taxonomy, the practice and science of classification or the result of it.

 Online access
Classified animals using a hierarchical system with 5 levels: Kingdom, class, order, genus and species. The official starting point of zoological nomenclature.
 
A two-volume work, going through many editions (ever expanding), listing all plants then known, made accessible by an ordering in (artificial) classes and orders, and giving every listed species a two-part name. With this book anybody, by counting the male and female parts present in a flower, could get to a listing of the genera the plant in question belongs to. The system of binomial nomenclature that bears his name effectively began with this work.

Zoology

This section contains a list of works on zoology, the study of the animal kingdom, including the structure, embryology, evolution, classification, habits, and distribution of all animals, both living and extinct.

  ( 77 – 79)
Encyclopedia of nature. It included many areas that are not considered to be part of nature sciences today - from geography, botany, zoology to painting. The encyclopedia was also novel with respect to its structure. It was the first to use references, table of contents and tables of animal characteristics.
 
Observations on birds and many other aspects of the natural world that White observed near where he lived.

See also
 List of zoology journals
 Outline of biology

References

Further reading

 Has a chronological table of publications in an appendix.

Biology
Biological literature
Publications in biology